Katakana Phonetic Extensions is a Unicode block containing additional small katakana characters for writing the Ainu language, in addition to characters in the Katakana block.

Further small katakana are present in the Small Kana Extension block.

History
The following Unicode-related documents record the purpose and process of defining specific characters in the Katakana Phonetic Extensions block:

References 

Unicode blocks
Ainu languages
Kana